The Butterfly Cluster (cataloged as Messier 6 or M6, and as NGC 6405) is an open cluster of stars in the southern constellation of Scorpius. Its name derives from the vague resemblance of its shape to a butterfly. The Trumpler classification of  encodes it is rich in stars, ranks II out of IV for disparateness and greatly mixes bright with faint components. It is 3.5° to the northwest of Messier 7, both north of the tail of Scorpius.

The first astronomer to record the Butterfly Cluster's existence was Giovanni Battista Hodierna in 1654. However, Robert Burnham Jr. has proposed that the 2nd century astronomer Ptolemy may have seen it with the naked eye while observing its neighbor the Ptolemy Cluster (M7). Credit for the discovery is usually given to Jean-Philippe Loys de Chéseaux in 1746. Charles Messier observed the cluster on May 23, 1764 and added it to his Messier Catalog.

Estimates of the Butterfly Cluster's distance have varied over the years. Wu et al. Modern measurements show its total visual brightness to be magnitude 4.2. The cluster is estimated to be 94.2 million years old. Cluster members show a slightly higher abundance of elements heavier than helium compared to the Sun; what astronomers refer to as the metallicity.

120 stars, ranging down to visual magnitude 15.1, have been identified as most likely cluster members. Most of the bright stars in this cluster are hot, blue B-type stars but the brightest member is a K-type orange giant star, BM Scorpii, which contrasts sharply with its blue neighbours in photographs. BM Scorpii, is classed as a semiregular variable star, its brightness varying from magnitude +5.5 to magnitude +7.0. There are also eight candidate chemically peculiar stars.

As of January 2022, the Butterfly Cluster is one of the few remaining objects within the Messier Catalog to not have been photographed by the Hubble Space Telescope.

See also
 List of open clusters
 List of Messier objects

References

External links

 Messier 6, SEDS Messier pages
 

Messier objects
NGC objects
Open clusters
Scorpius (constellation)
Orion–Cygnus Arm
?